The People's Choice is a greatest hits album by Nomeansno. It collects tracks from 1985 to 1998.

Track listing
 "Now" (from 0 + 2 = 1, 1991) – 5:09
 "Sex Mad" (from Sex Mad, 1986) – 4:13
 "Theresa, Give Me That Knife" (from Small Parts Isolated and Destroyed, 1988) – 2:13
 "Body Bag" (from You Kill Me, 1985) – 4:38
 "Angel or Devil" (from The Worldhood of the World (As Such), 1995) – 3:42
 "Rags 'n Bones" (from Wrong, 1989) – 5:07
 "I Need You" (from Why Do They Call Me Mr. Happy?, 1993) – 7:01
 "It's Catching Up" (from Wrong) – 3:29
 "Humans" (from The Worldhood of the World (As Such)) – 4:11
 "I Can't Stop Talking" (from Dance of the Headless Bourgeoisie, 1998) – 5:29
 "The Day Everything Became Nothing (Live)" (from Live + Cuddly, 1991) – 4:47
 "Dad" (from Sex Mad) – 3:00
 "The River" (Live) (from In the Fishtank 1, 1996) – 6:19
 "Victory" (from Small Parts Isolated and Destroyed) – 7:55
 "Give Me the Push" (from Dance of the Headless Bourgeoisie) – 6:37

Personnel
Nomeansno
 John Wright – vocals, drums, keyboards (all tracks)
 Rob Wright – vocals, bass, guitar (all tracks)
 Andy Kerr – vocals, guitar, bass (tracks 1–4, 6, 8, 11–12, 14)
 Tom Holliston – vocals, guitar (tracks 5, 9–10, 13, 15)
 Ken Kempster – drums (tracks 5, 9, 13)

Production
 Marc L'Esperance – mastering

References

2000 greatest hits albums
Nomeansno albums